WarGames is a 1983 American science fiction techno-thriller film written by Lawrence Lasker and Walter F. Parkes and directed by John Badham. The film, which stars Matthew Broderick, Dabney Coleman, John Wood, and Ally Sheedy, follows David Lightman (Broderick), a young hacker who unwittingly accesses a United States military supercomputer programmed to simulate, predict and execute nuclear war against the Soviet Union.

WarGames was a critical and commercial success, grossing $125 million worldwide against a $12 million budget. The film was nominated for three Academy Awards.

Plot 
During a surprise nuclear attack drill, many United States Air Force Strategic Missile Wing controllers prove unwilling to turn the keys required to launch a missile strike. Such refusals convince John McKittrick and other NORAD systems engineers that missile launch control centers must be automated, without human intervention. Control is given to a NORAD supercomputer known as WOPR (War Operation Plan Response, pronounced "whopper"), programmed to continuously run war simulations and learn over time.

David Lightman, a bright but unmotivated Seattle high school student and hacker, uses his IMSAI 8080 computer to access the school district's computer system and change his grades. He does the same for his friend and classmate Jennifer Mack. Later, while war dialing numbers in Sunnyvale, California, to find a computer game company, he connects with a system that does not identify itself. Asking for games, he finds a list including chess, checkers, backgammon, and poker, along with titles such as "Theaterwide Biotoxic and Chemical Warfare" and "Global Thermonuclear War", but cannot proceed further. Two hacker friends explain the concept of a backdoor password and suggest tracking down the Falken referenced in "Falken's Maze", the first game listed. David discovers that Stephen Falken was an early artificial-intelligence researcher, and guesses correctly that the name of Falken's deceased son (Joshua) is the password.

Unaware that the Sunnyvale phone number connects to WOPR at the Cheyenne Mountain Complex, David initiates a game of Global Thermonuclear War, playing as the Soviet Union while targeting American cities. The computer starts a simulation that briefly convinces NORAD military personnel that actual Soviet nuclear missiles are inbound. While they defuse the situation, WOPR nonetheless continues the simulation to trigger the scenario and win the game, as it does not understand the difference between reality and simulation. It continuously feeds false data such as Soviet bomber incursions and submarine deployments to NORAD, pushing them to increase the DEFCON level toward a retaliation that will start World War III.

David learns the true nature of his actions from a news broadcast, and FBI special agents arrest him and take him to NORAD. He realizes that WOPR is behind the NORAD alerts, but he fails to convince McKittrick (who believes David is working for the Soviets) and is charged with espionage. David escapes NORAD by joining a tourist group and, with Jennifer's help, travels to the Oregon island where Falken lives under the alias "Robert Hume". David and Jennifer find that Falken has become despondent, believing that nuclear war is inevitable and as futile as a game of tic-tac-toe between two experienced players. The teenagers convince Falken that he should return to NORAD to stop WOPR.

WOPR stages a massive Soviet first strike with hundreds of missiles, submarines, and bombers. Believing the attack to be genuine, NORAD prepares to retaliate. Falken, David, and Jennifer convince military officials to cancel the second strike and ride out the attack. When the targeted American bases report back unharmed, NORAD prepares to cancel the retaliatory second strike. WOPR tries to launch the missiles itself using a brute-force attack to obtain the launch codes. Without humans in the control centers as a safeguard using the two-man rule, the computer will trigger a mass launch. All attempts to log in and order WOPR to cancel the countdown fail. Disconnecting the computer is discussed and dismissed, as a failsafe will launch all weapons if the computer is disabled, acting like a fail-deadly ignition to World War III.

Falken and David direct the computer to play tic-tac-toe against itself. This results in a long string of draws, forcing the computer to learn the concept of futility and no-win scenarios. WOPR obtains the launch codes, but before launching, it cycles through all the nuclear war scenarios it has devised, finding that they all result in draws as well. Having discovered the concept of mutual assured destruction ("WINNER: NONE"), the computer tells Falken it has concluded that nuclear war is "a strange game" in which "the only winning move is not to play." WOPR relinquishes control of NORAD and the missiles and offers to play "a nice game of chess".

Cast

Production

Development 
Development on WarGames began in 1979, when writers Walter F. Parkes and Lawrence Lasker developed an idea for a script called The Genius, about "a dying scientist and the only person in the world who understands him—a rebellious kid who's too smart for his own good". Lasker was inspired by a television special presented by Peter Ustinov on several geniuses, including Stephen Hawking. Lasker said, "I found the predicament Hawking was in fascinating—that he might one day figure out the unified field theory and not be able to tell anyone, because of his progressive ALS. So there was this idea that he'd need a successor. And who would that be? Maybe this kid, a juvenile delinquent whose problem was that nobody realized he was too smart for his environment." The concept of computers and hacking as part of the film was not yet present.

The Genius began its transformation into WarGames when Parkes and Lasker met Peter Schwartz from the Stanford Research Institute. "There was a new subculture of extremely bright kids developing into what would become known as hackers," said Schwartz. Schwartz made the connection between youth, computers, gaming, and the military. Parkes and Lasker also met with computer-security expert Willis Ware of RAND Corporation, who assured them that even a secure military computer might have remote access enabling remote work on weekends, encouraging the screenwriters to continue with the project.

Parkes and Lasker came up with several military-themed plotlines before the final story. One version of the script had an early version of the WOPR named "Uncle Ollie", or Omnipresent Laser Interceptor (OLI), a space-based defensive laser run by an intelligent program, but this idea was discarded because it was too speculative. Director John Badham coined the name "WOPR", feeling that the name of NORAD's Single Integrated Operational Plan  was "boring, and told you nothing". The name "WOPR" played off the Whopper hamburger, and a general sense of something going "whop".

The WOPR computer, as seen in the film, was a prop created in Culver City, California, by members of the International Alliance of Theatrical Stage Employees Local 44. It was designed by production designer (credited as a visual consultant) Geoffrey Kirkland based on some pictures he had of early tabulating machines, and metal furniture, consoles, and cabinets used particularly in the U.S. military in the 1940s and '50s. Art director Angelo P. Graham adapted them in drawings and concepts. The WOPR was operated by a crewmember sitting inside the computer, entering commands into an Apple II at the director's instruction. The prop was broken up for scrap after production was completed. A replica was built for a 2006 AT&T commercial.

David Lightman was modeled on David Scott Lewis, a hacking enthusiast Parkes and Lasker met. Falken was inspired by and named after Stephen Hawking, with the appearance of John Lennon, who was interested in the role, but was murdered in New York while the script was in development. General Beringer was based on General James V. Hartinger (USAF), the then-commander-in-chief of NORAD, whom Parkes and Lasker met while visiting the base, and who, like Beringer, favored keeping humans in the decision loop.

Filming 
Martin Brest was originally hired as the director but was fired after 12 days of shooting because of a disagreement with the producers, and replaced with John Badham. Several of the scenes shot by Brest remain in the final film. Badham said that Brest had "taken a somewhat dark approach to the story and the way it was shot. It was like [Broderick and Sheedy] were doing some Nazi undercover thing, so it was my job to make it seem like they were having fun, and that it was exciting." According to Badham, Broderick and Sheedy were "stiff as boards" when they came onto the sound stage, having both Brest's dark vision and the idea that they would soon be fired. Badham did 12 to 14 takes of the first shot to loosen the actors up. At one point, Badham decided to race with the two actors around the sound stage, with the one who came last having to sing a song to the crew. Badham lost and sang "The Happy Wanderer", the silliest song he could think of. He invited what Wired described as "a small army of computer whizzes on set" to advise on accuracy.

Tom Mankiewicz says he wrote some additional scenes during shooting that were used.

Release 
WarGames did well at the box office, grossing $79,567,667, the fifth-highest of 1983 in the United States and Canada. It grossed $45 million internationally for a worldwide total of $124.6 million.

The film was screened out of competition at the 1983 Cannes Film Festival.

Reception

Critical response 
On Rotten Tomatoes, WarGames received an approval rating of 93% based on 46 reviews, with an average rating of 7.60/10. The site's critical consensus reads, "Part delightfully tense techno-thriller, part refreshingly unpatronizing teen drama, WarGames is one of the more inventive—and genuinely suspenseful—Cold War movies of the 1980s." On Metacritic, the film has a weighted average score of 77 out of 100 based on 15 critics, indicating "generally favorable reviews".

Roger Ebert gave WarGames four out of four stars, calling it "an amazingly entertaining thriller" and "one of the best films so far this year", with a "wonderful" ending. Leonard Maltin gave it a mixed review calling it "Fail Safe for the Pac-Man Generation" and "Entertaining to a point". He concluded, "Incidentally, it's easy to see why this was so popular with kids: most of the adults in the film are boobs."

Computer Gaming World stated that "Wargames is plausible enough to intrigue and terrifying enough to excite ... [it] makes one think, as well as feel, all the way", raised several moral questions about technology and society, and recommended the film to "Computer hobbyists of all kinds". Softline described the film as being "completely original"; unlike other computer-related films like Tron that "could (and do) exist in substantially the same form with some other plot", WarGames "could not exist if the microcomputer did not exist ... It takes the micro and telecommunications as a given—part of the middle-class American landscape". The magazine praised the film as "Very funny, excruciatingly suspenseful, and endlessly inventive, this movie is right on the mark; authentic even when highly improbable". Christopher John in Ares Magazine commented that "The movie cloaked itself in a standard message, but then set out to take something we have seen many times before and retell it in a new, interesting fashion. War Games is highly entertaining, fast-moving, colorful, and mentally stimulating". Colin Greenland in Imagine stated that "Wargames is a tense, tight film, sharply acted, funny, sane, and with a plot twist for every chilling sub-routine in WOPR's scenarios for World War III".

Accolades 
WarGames was nominated for three Academy Awards: Best Cinematography (William A. Fraker), Sound (Michael J. Kohut, Carlos Delarios, Aaron Rochin, Willie D. Burton), and Writing, Screenplay Written Directly for the Screen (Lawrence Lasker, Walter F. Parkes). The company that provided the large screens used to display the tactical situations seen in the NORAD set employed a new design that was super-bright enabling the displays to be filmed live. (The set was more visually impressive than the actual NORAD facilities at the time.) The animations seen on the NORAD displays, produced by Colin Cantwell, were created using Hewlett Packard HP 9845C computers driving monochrome HP 1345A vector displays, which were still-filmed through successive color-filters. Each frame took approximately one minute to produce, and 50,000 feet of negatives were produced over seven months. The animations were projected "live" onto the screens from behind using 16-mm film, so they were visible to the actors and no post-production work was needed. For this, the company was awarded an Academy Scientific and Technical Award.

Influence 
WarGames was the first mass-consumed, visual media with the central theme of remote computing as well as hacking, and it served as both an amplifier vehicle and framework for America's earliest discussion of information technology. In the wake of the film, major news media focused on the potential for the "WarGames scenario" to exist in reality. This focus contributed to the creation of the first U.S. federal internet policy, the Counterfeit Access Device and Computer Fraud and Abuse Act of 1984.

Bulletin board system (BBS) operators reported an unusual rise in activity in 1984, which at least one sysop attributed to WarGames introducing viewers to modems. The scenes showing Lightman's computer dialing every number in Sunnyvale led to the term "war dialing" (earlier known as "demon dialing"), a technique of using a modem to scan a list of telephone numbers in search of unknown computers, and indirectly to the newer term "wardriving".

President Ronald Reagan, a family friend of Lasker's, watched the film and discussed the plot with members of Congress, his advisers, and the Joint Chiefs of Staff. Reagan's interest in the film is credited with leading to the enactment 18 months later of NSDD-145, the first Presidential directive on computer security.

Video games 
A video game, WarGames, was released for the ColecoVision in 1983 and ported to the Atari 8-bit family and Commodore 64 in 1984. It played similarly to the NORAD side of the "Global Thermonuclear War" game, where the United States had to be defended from a Soviet strike by placing bases and weapons at strategic points. WarGames: Defcon 1, a real-time strategy game only loosely related to the film, was released for the PlayStation and PC in 1998.

A game inspired by the film, called "Computer War" from Thorn EMI, in which the player must track and shoot down intercontinental ballistic missiles, as well as crack a computer code, was released for the Atari 8-bit family, TI-99/4A, and VIC-20.

The film also inspired the Introversion game DEFCON (2006).

The Nintendo Entertainment System video game Mission: Impossible featured an homage to the movie's ending in which the player must challenge a large supercomputer to a game similar to tic-tac-toe and force a stalemate, thereby preventing a missile launch via countdown which would ultimately have led to full-scale nuclear war. The computer takes control and simulates various world war scenarios based on the game itself. After concluding that there's no way to win, the machine gives up and cancels the missile launch.

Be-Rad Entertainment released a tile-matching video game, "WarGames: WOPR", for iOS and Android devices in 2012.

Soundtrack 
The film's music was composed and conducted by Arthur B. Rubinstein. A soundtrack album including songs and dialogue excerpts was released by Polydor Records. Intrada Records issued an expanded release in 2008 with the complete score, with expanded horn sections and without the film dialogue. In 2018, Quartet Records issued a 35th anniversary expanded 2-CD edition containing the score as presented in the film, and the 1983 Polydor album on disc 2.

Sequel 

In November 2006, preproduction began on a sequel, titled WarGames: The Dead Code. It was directed by Stuart Gillard, and starred Matt Lanter as a hacker named Will Farmer facing off with a government supercomputer called RIPLEY. MGM released the sequel directly to DVD on July 29, 2008, along with the 25th Anniversary Edition DVD of WarGames. To promote the sequel, the original film returned to selected theaters as a one-night-only 25th-anniversary event on July 24, 2008.

Interactive series 

An interactive media reboot of WarGames was announced by MGM in 2015, with Interlude serving as its co-production company. The project was described as an "audience-driven story experience", with anticipated launch in 2016. In March 2016, Sam Barlow announced he has joined Interlude and would be serving as a creative lead in the series, based on his work from his video game, "Her Story", which required the player to piece together a mystery based on a series of video clips. Interlude rebranded itself as Eko in December 2016, and the six-episode series was released in March 2018.

Legacy 
Critics have cited the film as an influence on Mamoru Hosoda's 2000 short film Digimon Adventure: Our War Game!, with critic Geoffrey G. Thew, writing in Anime Impact: The Movies and Shows that Changed the World of Japanese Animation, noting that both films share a title and a plot of "a rogue AI hijacking the Internet to spread chaos and potentially destroy the world, only to be stopped by some kids on their computers." Hosoda later stated that Our War Game "kind of started my idea for [his 2009 film] Summer Wars," noting that Summer Wars "became the feature-length version of that idea" and allowed him to explore material he was unable to in Our War Game's 40 minute runtime.

See also 
 1983 Soviet nuclear false alarm incident, which occurred a few months after the release

References

External links 

 
 
 
 
 
 
 The IMSAI computer used in the film

1983 films
1983 thriller films
American science fiction thriller films
Cheyenne Mountain Complex
Cold War films
Films about artificial intelligence
Films about computing
Films about nuclear war and weapons
Films about technological impact
Films about the United States Air Force
Films about video games
Films directed by John Badham
Films scored by Arthur B. Rubinstein
Films set in Colorado
Films set in Oregon
Films set in Seattle
Films set in Washington (state)
Films shot in Colorado
Films shot in Washington (state)
Metro-Goldwyn-Mayer films
United Artists films
Techno-thriller films
Works about computer hacking
1983 drama films
Films with screenplays by Walter F. Parkes
1980s English-language films
1980s American films